Jung District (Jung-gu, Korean:중구, 中區) is a gu in southern central Daejeon, South Korea. It consists of 17 branches including Sunhwa-dong, Mokdong, Jungchon-dong, Daeheung-dong, Munchang-dong, Seokgyodong, Daesa-dong, Bussa-dong, Sanseong-dong, Yongdu-dong, Yudong-dong, Taepyeong 1 ~ 2 dong, Yucheon 1 ~ 2 dong and Culture 1 ~ 2 dong. The location of the ward office is in Daeheung-dong, Jung-gu.

Cultural Heritage 
There is the Bomunsan Mountain, Bomunsanji, and Bomunsan Mae Aeae.

References

External links
Jung-gu homepage

Sister Cities
 Malabon, Philippines